Giovanni Bassignani (1669 – May 1717) was an Italian architect and engineer of the late-Baroque.

Born in Brescia, to Tuscan parents, he studied in Padua then traveled to Venice, Modena, and Genoa. He aided the Venetian Republic in a number of military projects, including rebuilding forts for the defense of Morea, in their wars against the Ottomans. He was wounded in the battles for Negroponte.

References

1669 births
1717 deaths
Architects from Brescia
Italian Baroque architects
Italian military engineers
Engineers from Brescia